Livonian Coast is a territory of Latvia  historically inhabited by Livonian people. It is located in Northern Courland and encompasses twelve Livonian villages. The protected area is about 60 kilometers long.

On February 4, 1991, the Latvian government created a culturally protected territory called  – the Livonian Coast – which included all twelve of the Livonian villages: Lūžņa (Livonian: Lūž), Miķeļtornis (Pizā), Lielirbe (Īra), Jaunciems (Ūžkilā), Sīkrags (Sīkrõg), Mazirbe (Irē), Košrags (Kuoštrõg), Saunags (Sǟnag), Vaide (Vaid), Kolka (Kūolka) (see also Cape Kolka), Pitrags (Pitrõg), and Melnsils (Mustānum). The Latvian government discourages new settlements here and prohibits alterations to historical village sites. Also, it is restricted for anyone to start a hotel, restaurant, or other public establishment which might adversely influence the Livonian culture or draw outsiders into the area. However, there have been several old fishermen or farmer houses converted into modern summerhouses by Latvian higher class, as well as some well-off descendants of local Livonian families. Among them is former President of Latvia, former Prime Minister, Ministers, politicians, CEOs, bankers and businessmen, artists, doctors, etc. There are some prominent German, Russian and Swedish residents. The coast is also becoming more popular with Lithuanians. The Livonian Coast is part of Slītere National Park.

Local roads 

Until World War I these villages were connected only by small forest roads along the coast and were practically inaccessible from inland. Most deliveries were made by the sea and most villages had their own pier (remains of piers can still be seen in Saunags, Pitrags and Mazirbe; only Kolka pier is still in use). During World War I the German Army built a narrow-gauge railway behind the dunes to move ammunition and wood. The railway connected Pitrags, Mazirbe and Lielirbe with Dundaga, a small regional town. Earthworks were installed to extend railway from Pitrags to Saunags and Vaide, but the work was interrupted by moving front lines. Between the two wars, the railway was the main method for passenger transportation along the Livonian coast. After World War II, in 1950s the Soviet Army built a wide dirt road connecting all the villages and the railway become obsolete. The railway was closed completely in 1960s, but there are several straight sections of roads or passages which still can be seen behind the dunes in Saunags and Pitrags, and in forests in Mazirbe and Lielirbe. During 2009–2011 the dirt road was asphalted and modernised as part of EU funded Kolka-Ventspils road project. Several years ago replica Mazirbe railway station (original station is still standing now as a private house in Mazirbe) was re-created as part of narrow gauge railway line in Ventspils, along with a restored engine and carriages, and is now used as a tourist attraction.

See also 
 Cape Kolka

References

External links 
 The State Institution Līvõd Rānda

Ethnic groups in Latvia
Languages of Latvia